Thomas Hoepker (German: Thomas Höpker; born 10 June 1936) is a German photographer and member of Magnum Photos. He is known for stylish color photo features. He also documented the 9/11 World Trade Center destruction. Hoepker originally made a name for himself in the 1960s as a photojournalist with a desire to photograph human conditions.

Life and work
Hoepker was born in Munich, Germany. He first began taking pictures when he was 16 and received an old 9x12 glass plate camera from his grandfather. He developed his prints in his family's kitchen and bathroom, and began to earn a little money by selling pictures to friends and classmates. Hoepker studied art history and archaeology from 1956 to 1959 in Göttingen, Germany, where he learned about understanding images and composition. While in school he continued to photograph and sell images to help finance his education.

From 1960 to 1963 he worked as a photographer for Münchner Illustrierte and Kristall, reporting from around the world. Then in 1964 he began working as a photojournalist for Stern. In the 1970s he also worked as a cameraman for German TV, making documentary films. In 1976 he and his wife, journalist Eva Windmoeller, relocated to New York City as correspondents for Stern. From 1978 to 1981 he was director of photography for American Geo. From 1987 to 1989 Hoepker was based in Hamburg, working as art director for Stern.

Magnum Photos first began distributing Hoepker's photographs in 1964. He became a full member in 1989. He served as Magnum President from 2003 to 2006.

For much of his career Hoepker used Leica cameras. In the 1970s he began to also use single-lens reflex cameras alongside his Leica, using Leicas for wide angle shots and Nikon or Canon cameras with zoom lenses. In 2002 he began using digital SLRs.

Today, Hoepker lives in New York City with his second wife Christine Kruchen, with whom he produces TV documentaries.

Bibliography
Jugend in dieser Zeit, Steingrüben, Germany, 1957
Finnland, Terra Magica, Germany, 1960
Lebendiges Kiel, Presseamt der Stadt Kiel, Germany, 1963
Yatun papa. Father of the Indians. Dr. Theodor Binder, Kosmos, Germany, 1963
Horst Janssen, artist’s portraits, Galerie Brockstedt, Germany, 1967
Die Iren und ihre Lieder, (The Irish and their songs), Germany, 1974
Berliner Wände,  C. Hanser, Germany, 1976
Heinz Mack, Expedition in künstliche Gärten. Art in Desert and Ice, Sternbuch, Germany, 1977
Vienna, Time/Life books, Holland, 1978
Thomas Höpker (I Grandi Fotografi), Rizzoli, Italy, 1983
Die New York-Story, GEO Buch, Germany, 1983
Now! Überdosis New York/ HA Schult., Germany, 1984
Der Wahn vom Weltreich: Germany’s former Colonies, Sternbuch, Germany, 1984
Ansichten.Fotos von 1960 bis 1985, Braus, Heidelberg, Germany, 1985
Leben in der DDR. Life in East Germany, Sternbuch, Germany, 1985
Amerika: History of the discovery from Florida to Canada, Germany, 1986
HA Schult, New York ist Berlin, Germany, 1986
New Yorker: 50 unusual portraits, Stemmle, Schaffhausen, Germany, 1987
Rome, Hofmann & Campe, Germany, 1988
HA Schult, Fetisch Auto, Germany, 1989
Land of Enchantment, New Mexico, Philip-Morris books, Germany, 1991
Return of the Maya: Guatemala. A Tale of Survival, Henry Holt, USA, 1998. 
Thomas Hoepker, Photographien 1955-2005, Schirmer & Mosel, Germany, 2005. 
Champ, Berlin: Peperoni, 2012. 
Thomas Hoepker, New York, teNeues, Germany, 2013. 
Heartland. Berlin: Peperoni, 2013. 
Wonderlust teNeues; Multilingual edition, 2014. 
Big Champ. Berlin: Peperoni, 2015.

Filmography
The Village Arabati (1973)
Death in a Cornfield (1998)
Robinson Crusoe Island (2000)
Easter Island (2003)
Ice-cold Splendor (2005)

Awards
 1967: 3rd Place Award for Photo Stories, World Press Photo, Amsterdam
 1977: 1st Place Award for Art and Sciences, World Press Photo, Amsterdam
 Leica Hall of Fame Induction, Leica Awards

Exhibitions

Kunst und Gewerbe Museum, Hamburg, Germany, 1965
Rizzoli Gallery, New York and Rizzoli Gallery, Washington D.C., 1976
Retrospective, 25 cities in Germany, 1985–1987
The Maya Kunsthalle Cologne, Cologne, Germany, 1994
Retrospective, Claus Tebbe Gallery, Cologne, Germany, 1995
Photographien 1955-2005, Photomuseum, Munich, Germany, 2006
Heartland, Leica Gallery Prague, Prague, Germany, 2014
Ali and Beyond, Bildhalle Museum, Zürich, Switzerland, 2015

References

External links
 Essay by Hoepker in Slate about one of his 9/11 photographs
 Interview with Charlie Rose about photographing 9/11, recorded Oct. 31, 2001
 Magnum Photos biography
 Hoepker's portfolio at Magnum
 Interview with HP

1936 births
Living people
Photographers from Munich
Magnum photographers
German expatriates in the United States